The German War Graves Commission ( in German) is responsible for the maintenance and upkeep of German war graves in Europe and North Africa. Its objectives are acquisition, maintenance and care of German war graves; tending to next of kin; youth and educational work; and preservation of the memory to the sacrifices of war and despotism. Former head of the Bundeswehr Wolfgang Schneiderhan was elected President of the organisation in 2016, succeeding SPD politician Markus Meckel. The President of Germany, currently Frank-Walter Steinmeier (SPD), is the organisation's patron.

Role 
The German War Graves Commission cares for the graves, at 832 cemeteries in 46 countries, of more than 2.7 million persons killed during World War I and World War II. The German war graves are intended to remember all groups of war dead: military personnel, those dead by aerial warfare, murdered in the Holocaust, and all other persons persecuted to death.  In addition, the Volksbund maintains cemeteries and memorials of the Franco-Prussian War, First Schleswig War, Second Schleswig War, and the German colonial era.

History

Establishment 
The commission was founded as a private charity on 16 December 1919, as the recognised [German] Commission under the war graves provisions of Article 225 of the Treaty of Versailles. By the 1930s, the commission had established numerous cemeteries for German World War I dead...

World War II and postwar 
During World War II, the Volksbund's work was mostly carried out by the Wehrmacht's own graves service. After World War II, the Volksbund resumed its work in 1946 and soon established more than 400 war cemeteries in Germany. In 1954, the German chancellor Konrad Adenauer, tasked the Volksbund with the establishment, care and upkeep of German war cemeteries abroad.

Philosophy 
To guard the memory of the victims of war and violence, to work for peace among all nations and to guarantee dignity of men,  are the main goals in the statutes of the German War Graves Commission. All activities of German War Graves Commission must harmonize with these general principles.

Organisation

Financing 
The Commission spent about 52 million Euro (in 2019). Half of it was used for maintenance of the cemeteries, more than a third to remind what happened and to learn from it, the rest was used to keep the association running. Two-thirds of this sum was financed by members and private donations. One-third was paid by government (war graves outside of Germany) and states (maintenance of some war graves within Germany).

Activities

Casualties, war graves, prisoner of war graves 
The commission looks after "832 military cemeteries in 46 countries with about 2.75 million dead" and its work is carried out today by 8,000 honorary and 556 full-time employees. Since the end of the Cold War, the Volksbund has access to Eastern Europe, where most World War II German casualties occurred. Since 1991, 188 World War I cemeteries and 330 World War II cemeteries in eastern, central and south-eastern Europe have been reconstructed or rebuilt and about 764,524 bodies have been buried in new graves.
 With 46 foreign partner countries bilateral war grave agreements were settled by the year 2019. Requests on foreign war graves in Germany are handled by the German War Graves Commission.
 On behalf of German Government, the construction, repair and care of German War cemeteries outside of Germany is handled by the Division of Cemetery Construction and Building Maintenance. In 2019, the workload covered more than 832 war cemeteries of World War I and World War II and more than 800 war cemeteries/memorial sites of the Franco-Prussian War of 1870–71.
 The German War Graves Commission (Volksbund) cooperates with and uses the files of German Federal Archives, former Deutsche Dienststelle (WASt) in Berlin (Register of German soldiers killed in action or who became prisoners of war). This bureau collects and preserves data and dog tags of active German soldiers of World War II. The Volksbund is in close contact with other tracing services, e.g. the German Red Cross. Information gathered on occasion of exhumation of bodies is recorded by Volksbund and transferred to other institutions to assist in identifying missing people (for example, by dog tags) and by updating files.
 The commission searches for war casualties and when found, transfers them to central cemeteries in Eastern Europe, Germany and Western Europe through the Volksbund exhumation service. There were 19,735 exhumations in the year 2019. Search for undetected burial places of war casualties is done by records of former WASt, eyewitnesses, historical photographs of World War II cemeteries and assistance of local residents during construction of new roads or structures. Names of missing soldiers are remembered, e.g. in Rossoschka German War Cemetery, on granite cubes as memorials for family members and as a warning for future generations in their effort to live in peace.
 The exhumation service documents in a draft manual document for each body of a soldier found at the grave site, the dog tag (if existent), the remaining clothing and other individual belongings, human height, characteristics of human skeleton, state of dental notation to make it easier to identify later unknown soldiers.
 From about 6,200 cemeteries for German prisoners of war 180 were reconstructed (state: 2011). Cemeteries for prisoners of war cannot all be maintained. So only a selection of prisoner of war cemeteries will serve the memory for those who died in war captivity.

War grave database online 
The German War Graves Commission offers an accessible online database of 4.8 million individual names for World Wars I and II.

War cemeteries and war dead of World War I and II inside of Germany are also documented in these files (895,561 in 2010). Among these are war dead transferred to Germany or persons who died within Germany but only those are registered whose remains were transferred to war cemetery areas within civil cemeteries, not those removed to individual family graves.

Further in this database persons can be found who died by aerial bombing of cities, as prisoner of war or in imprisonment, partly foreign members of German auxiliary troops who died in World War II or even some members of Wehrmacht who died before World War II began.

A grave research request ( in German) can be sent online or as hardcopy to Volksbund (German War Grave Commission) to clarify the unknown fate of a German soldier. As some family names are very common it is important to mention all given names and the date of birth of the missing soldier. As additional data should be given if available: date of death, last unit ( in German) and last letters. Often withdrawing troops could not bury their casualties. Detailed data on the war dead of World War I were reconstructed by volunteers in digital format.

List of German cemeteries by country/conflict

War cemetery database online 
German War Graves Commission has an online inventory of its cemeteries. Data collected for each cemetery are location (geography), how to reach, number of dead, course of military events in the region and architecture of the cemetery.

Some cemeteries by country 

Australia – World War I & II
 Tatura German Military Cemetery (Total Burials: 250)

Austria – World War I & II
 List of German war cemeteries in Austria :de:Liste von Soldatenfriedhöfen in Österreich

Belgium – World War I
 Vladslo German war cemetery (Total burials: 25,644)
 Langemark German war cemetery (Total Burials: over 44,000)
 Menen German war cemetery (Total Burials: 47,864)
 Hooglede German war cemetery (Total Burials: 8,247)

Belgium – World War I & II
 Lommel German war cemetery, (Total burials World War I: 542, World War II: 38,560)

Belgium – World War II
 Recogne German war cemetery, (Total burials: 6,809)

Canada – World War I & II
 Kitchener German war cemetery, Ontario (Total Burials: 187)

Croatia – World War II
 Split German war cemetery (Lovrinac)
 Zagreb German war cemetery

Egypt – World War II
 El Alamein German war cemetery in El Alamein :de: Deutsche Kriegsgräberstätte El Alamein 
Finland – World War I & II
 Helsinki-Honkanummi German war cemetery :de:Deutscher Soldatenfriedhof Helsinki-Honkanummi, (Total burials World War I: 6, World War II: 364)

Finland – World War II
 German Military Cemetery Rovaniemi (Total burials: 2,530)

France (Western Front) – World War I
 Fricourt German war cemetery (Somme) (Total burials: 17,027)
 Gerbéviller German Military Cemetery (Lorraine) (Total burials: 5,462) 
 Vermandovillers German war cemetery (Total burials: 22,632)  Somme Département
 Neuville-St Vaast German war cemetery (Arras) (Total burials: 44,843)

France (Normandy) – World War II
 Orglandes German war cemetery (Total burials: 10,152)
 Huisnes-sur-Mer German cemetery :fr:Mausolée du Mont d'Huisnes (Total burials: 11,956) 
 La Cambe German war cemetery (Total burials: 21,222) 
 Andilly German war cemetery :fr:Cimetière militaire allemand d'Andilly (Total burials : 33,085)
 Saint-Désir-de-Lisieux German war cemetery
 Marigny German war cemetery :fr:Cimetière militaire allemand de Marigny (Total burials: 11,169)
 Champigny-Saint-André German war cemetery (19,831)

Southern France – World War II
 Berneuil German war cemetery :fr:Cimetière militaire allemand de Berneuil (Total burials: 8,332)

Greece
 Dionyssos-Rapendoza German war cemetery (Total burials: 9,973) 
 Maleme German war cemetery (Total burials: 4,465)

Ireland – World War I & World War II
 Glencree German war cemetery
Israel – World War I
 Nazareth German war cemetery :de: Deutscher Soldatenfriedhof in Nazareth

Italy – World War II
 Futa Pass Cemetery (Total burials: 30,683)
 :it: Cimitero militare germanico di Pomezia (Total burials: 27,443)
 :it: Cimitero militare tedesco di Costermano (Total burials: 22,028)
 :it: Cimitero militare germanico di Motta Sant'Anastasia (Total burials: 4,561)

Luxembourg – World War II
 Sandweiler German war cemetery (Total Burials: 10,913)

Netherlands – World War I & World War II
 Ysselsteyn German war cemetery, (Total Burials World War I: 85, World War II: 31,513)

Russia – World War II
 Krasnogorsk German war cemetery (POWs, near Moscow)
Rossoschka German war cemetery 
 Sologubovka Cemetery

Spain – World War I & World War II
 Cuacos de Yuste German war cemetery :es: Cementerio Alemán de Cuacos de Yuste

Tunisia – World War II
 Bordj Cedria German war cemetery, Tunisia  :de: Soldatenfriedhof Bordj Cedria

United Kingdom – World War I & II
 Cannock Chase German Military Cemetery (looked after by the Commonwealth War Graves Commission) (Total Burials 4,855)

War-graves commissions in other countries 

 Austria – Austrian Black Cross (Austrian War graves on the Vienna Central cemetery are still looked after by German War Graves Commission.)
 France – 
 Ministère de la Défense with online data base of war graves
 National Office for Veterans and Victims of War (ONACVG)
 Souvenir Français.
 Netherlands – Oorlogsgravenstichting (Netherlands Wikipedia)
 Russia – Association of War Memorials
 United Kingdom (and former overseas Imperial territories Australia, Canada, India, New Zealand, and South Africa) – Commonwealth War Graves Commission
 United States – American Battle Monuments Commission

References

External links 

 Homepage Volksbund Deutscher Kriegsgräberfürsorge (German War Graves Commission) 
 The Great War 1914–1918: Volksbund Deutsche Kriegsgräberfürsorge (VDK)
 Spirit of Remembrance: German Remembrance & Peace 
 David Crossland: Database of fallen Soldiers. Germany Still Locates 40,000 War Casualties a Year. In: Spiegel Online International, May 08, 2012
 International youthcamps/workcamps to work on German wargraves 
 Homepage Volksbund Deutsche Kriegsgräberfürsorge (German War Graves Commission) 
 Der Volksbund Deutsche Kriegsgräberfürsorge e. V. (German War Graves Commission) – Online Gräbersuche (online grave search) 
 Inventory of German War Grave cemeteries in geographical order (Land=country, Friedhof=name of cemetery) 
 Inventory of German War Grave cemeteries in alphabetical order  

 
Organizations established in 1919
1919 establishments in Germany
Military cemeteries
Military history of Germany